Sven-Bertil Gunnar Evert Taube (24 November 1934 – 11 November 2022) was a Swedish singer and actor. Internationally, he was perhaps better known for his acting career. Taube played Henrik Vanger in the film The Girl with the Dragon Tattoo, and the lead role in Puppet on a Chain.

Biography 
Born in Stockholm on 24 November 1934, he was the son of songwriter Evert Taube and sculptor Astri Taube. At age 14, Taube began playing guitar. While traveling throughout Europe, he developed an interest in folklore and folk music. He performed in concerts on Swedish radio while a student at the Royal Beskow School in Stockholm.

Taube graduated in 1954 from the Cherry Lawn School in Darien, Connecticut.  While he was a student at the school, Folkways Records invited him to record an album of Swedish folk songs. From 1959 to 1962, he studied acting at the Royal Dramatic Training Academy in Stockholm. In 1969, Taube moved to London where he was active in British theatre.

Taube was married four times, and had four children. He was for many years residing in Fulham. He belonged to an untitled branch of the Baltic German noble Taube family, introduced at the Swedish House of Nobility in 1668 as noble family No. 734. He died in London on 11 November 2022, aged 87.

Musical career 
Taube released his first album in 1954; it included a cover of one of his father's songs. He has since released many albums which include songs written by his father. Several of his most well-known versions of Evert Taube songs come from albums recorded in the 1970s, but he recorded more of them at later stages, including his 2007 album Alderville Road.  Referring to that album, reviewer Peter Dahlgren said, "Evert had the yarns and Sven-Bertil had the voice."

He recorded songs from both Fredman's Epistles and Fredman's Songs by the popular Swedish 18th-century songwriter Carl Michael Bellman. Paul Britten Austin wrote in his 1967 biography of Bellman that Sven-Bertil Taube's two Bellman albums (released in 1960 and 1963) "have sold more copies than any other disc, popular or classical, ever released in Sweden". Göran Forsling wrote that Taube helped to start "a new era in Bellman interpretation around 1960", like Fred Åkerström giving the songs "a hitherto unheard earthbound realism".

Taube recorded work by the poet Nils Ferlin (1898–1961), whose poems were mostly put to music by Lille Bror Söderlundh. Taube also recorded an album with songs by the Swedish songwriter and musician Ulf Peder Olrog, one with Swedish translations of songs by French songwriter Léo Ferré, and one with Swedish translations of songs by Greek composer Mikis Theodorakis.

In 2015, Taube took part in Så mycket bättre, a reality show broadcast on TV4 in which musical artists attempt to make their own version of other artists' well-known songs.

Selected discography

Acting career 
Taube also started an acting career that took him to London, where he performed in theater and musicals, notably as Prince Albert in I and Albert.
He won a role on the television series Upstairs, Downstairs. In the 1970s, Taube tried to find work as a film actor, and had some minor roles, most notably in the 1976 World War II drama The Eagle Has Landed
and a starring role as a US agent in the 1971 film version of Alistair MacLean's novel Puppet on a Chain.

During the 1980s and 1990s, Taube starred in a number of Swedish films and television series, while still active as a musician.

Taube starred in the Swedish film version of Stieg Larsson's novel, The Girl with the Dragon Tattoo, in the role of Henrik Vanger. The film was awarded the Best Film, and Taube was nominated for the Best Supporting Actor award, at the 45th Guldbagge Awards.

In 2005, Taube took part in the first season of Stjärnorna på slottet on Sveriges Television, where he discussed his long career.

Awards 
1995: 30th Guldbagge Awards – "Best Actor in a Leading Role" in 

Nominations 
1997:  – "Best Actor in a Supporting Role" in Jerusalem 
2009: 45th Guldbagge Awards – "Best Actor in a Supporting Role" in The Girl with the Dragon Tattoo

Selected filmography 
 Hugs and Kisses (1967)
 Sixtynine 69 (1969)
 The Buttercup Chain (1970)
 Puppet on a Chain (1971)
 The Eagle Has Landed (1976)
 Game for Vultures (1979)
 Taube håller hov (The Court of Taube, 1985)
 August Strindberg: Ett liv (August Strindberg: A life, 1985)
  (When the Robbers Came to Cardamom Town, 1988)
 Codename: Kyril (1988, TV)
Ålder okänd (1991)
  (In The Hands, 1994)
 Sånt är livet (That's life, 1996)
 Jerusalem (1996)
 Slutspel (Endgame, 1997)
 Jobbet och jag (Work and I, 1998)
 Art (1999)
 London Voodoo (2004)
 Arn: The Knight Templar (2007)
 The Girl with the Dragon Tattoo (2009)
  (A One-way Trip to Antibes, 2011)

Theatre 
1999: Annie as Oliver Warbucks – piece directed by Trond Lie

References

External links 

 
 
 

1934 births
2022 deaths
Swedish male singers
Swedish male film actors
Swedish nobility
Baltic nobility
Swedish people of German descent
Litteris et Artibus recipients
Best Actor Guldbagge Award winners
Male actors from Stockholm
Swedish male stage actors
Interpreters of Carl Michael Bellman's works
Folkways Records artists
EMI Records artists
Sonet Records artists